The 1998 Swedish Open was a men's tennis tournament played on Clay in Båstad, Sweden that was part of the International Series of the 1998 ATP Tour. It was the fifty-first edition of the tournament and was held from 6–12 July 1998.

Seeds
Champion seeds are indicated in bold text while text in italics indicates the round in which those seeds were eliminated.

Draw

Finals

Top half

Bottom half

References

External links
 Main draw

Singles
Swedish Open